The 2014 Al Habtoor Tennis Challenge was a professional tennis tournament played on outdoor hard courts. It was the 16th edition of the tournament which was part of the 2014 ITF Women's Circuit, offering a total of $75,000 in prize money. It took place in Dubai, United Arab Emirates, on 10–16 November 2014.

Singles entrants

Seeds 

 1 Rankings as of 3 November 2014

Other entrants 
The following players received wildcards into the singles main draw:
  Akgul Amanmuradova
  Laura Pous Tió
  Alexandra Riley
  Olga Savchuk

The following players received entry from the qualifying draw:
  Amandine Hesse
  Kateřina Kramperová
  Irina Ramialison
  Viktoriya Tomova

The following player received entry into the singles main draw as a lucky loser:
  Nicoleta-Cătălina Dascălu

Champions

Singles 

  Alexandra Dulgheru def.  Kimiko Date-Krumm 6–3, 6–4

Doubles 

  Vitalia Diatchenko /  Alexandra Panova def.  Lyudmyla Kichenok /  Olga Savchuk 3–6, 6–2, [10–4]

External links 
 
 2014 Al Habtoor Tennis Challenge at ITFtennis.com

2014
2014 ITF Women's Circuit
2014 in Emirati tennis
November 2014 sports events in Asia